Lourinhasaurus (meaning "Lourinhã lizard") was an herbivorous sauropod dinosaur genus dating from Late Jurassic strata of Estremadura, Portugal.

Discovery
The first find in 1949 by Harold Weston Robbins, a partial fossil skeleton found near Alenquer, was in 1957 named Apatosaurus alenquerensis by Albert-Félix de Lapparent and Georges Zbyszewski. The specific name alenquerensis refers to the locality of Alenquer.

The species has subsequently been referred to other genera. In 1970 Rodney Steel renamed it Atlantosaurus alenquerensis, in 1978 George Olshevsky coined a Brontosaurus alenquerensis. John Stanton McIntosh in 1990 proposed that it was a species of Camarasaurus: Camarasaurus alenquerensis. However, the find of another partial skeleton, ML 414, including a tooth and a hundred gastroliths, in co-eval strata near the town of Lourinhã in 1983, induced Pedro Dantas e.a. in 1998 to see the taxon as a distinct form from Apatosaurus and Camarasaurus. He therefore named the separate genus Lourinhasaurus. The type species is Apatosaurus alenquerensis, the combinatio nova is Lourinhasaurus alenquerensis. This is the only species in the genus. The genus name refers to the locality of the second skeleton. However, already in 1999 this second specimen was given a genus name of its own: Dinheirosaurus.

The material originally consisted of a series of syntypes from the Sobral Member of the Lourinhã Formation dating from the Kimmeridgian. In 2003, Miguel Antunes and Octávio Mateus chose specimens MIGM 4956-7, 4970, 4975, 4979-80, 4983-4 and 5780-1 as the lectotype. They consist of disarticulated bones of a single individual.

Description
Lourinhasaurus alenquerensis is a herbivorous dinosaur measuring an estimated seventeen meters (56 feet) in length. It is characterized by the morphology of its first seven dorsal vertebrae with relatively high, bifurcated neural apophyses; also, the posterior cervical vertebrae have prominent ventral longitudinal keels on their centra. It is thought that it may have resembled Camarasaurus, albeit with proportionately longer forelimbs.

Phylogeny
Lourinhasaurus alenquerensis is a member of the Eusauropoda. A more precise determination has proven difficult, partly due to the lack of a skull. Originally it was seen as a diplodocid. In the 1990s it was often considered a member of the Camarasauridae. However, it was found by Upchurch (2004) to be more basal, the sister taxon to the Neosauropoda.
 
Pedro Mocho et al. in 2014 revised and redescribed the fossil remains that constitute the Lourinhasaurus alenquerensis lectotype, including elements never described before. The phylogenetic hypothesis proposed by Mocho et al. (2014) suggests that Lourinhasaurus is a basal member of the Macronaria, a species of the Camarasauromorpha, closely related to Camarasaurus, a genus of the Upper Jurassic Morrison Formation. This study recovered, for the first time in a cladistic analysis, Camarasauridae as a monophyletic clade, including Camarasaurus, Lourinhasaurus and Tehuelchesaurus.

References 

Macronarians
Kimmeridgian life
Late Jurassic dinosaurs of Europe
Jurassic Portugal
Fossils of Portugal
 
Fossil taxa described in 1998
Taxa named by Albert-Félix de Lapparent